Paddy Gilchrist (10 November 1889 – 7 August 1970) was an Australian rules footballer who played for Collingwood in the Victorian Football League (VFL).

Gilchrist played as the ruckman in 37 games over four years with Collingwood, including the 1910 Grand Final win over Carlton. Gilchrist won a premiership in his first season in the VFL.

Gilchrist played only one game in his last season in the VFL, a win against Melbourne in round one, 1913.

References

External links

 
 

Collingwood Football Club players
Collingwood Football Club Premiership players
1889 births
1970 deaths
Australian rules footballers from Victoria (Australia)
One-time VFL/AFL Premiership players